The 1944 Missouri lieutenant gubernatorial election was held on November 7, 1944. Democratic nominee Walter Naylor Davis defeated Republican nominee James G. Blaine with 50.85% of the vote.

Primary elections
Primary elections were held on August 1, 1944.

Democratic primary

Candidates
Walter Naylor Davis, attorney
Dan D. Porter
David B. Russell
Cullen S. Duncan, State Senator
Redmond S. Brennan

Results

Republican primary

Candidates
James G. Blaine
Joseph T. Tate
Orland K. Armstrong, State Representative
Claude L. Lambert
H. B. Hart, State Senator
Edwin A. Duensing
Aaron J. Rehkop, former State Senator

Results

General election

Candidates
Major party candidates
Walter Naylor Davis, Democratic
James G. Blaine, Republican

Other candidates
Edith F. Stevens, Socialist
Michael L. Hiltner, Socialist Labor

Results

References

1944
Gubernatorial
Missouri